Toksport WRT is a motorsport preparation and race team based at the Nürburgring in Quiddelbach, Germany. The team has prepared cars for, and entered events in 26 motorsport championships around the globe and has won notable FIA championships in European Rally Championship, World Rally Championship and Cross Country Rally World Cup as well as entering WTCC and GT series. The company that owns the team, DBO Motor Sport GmbH, was founded in 2002.

History

2019
In 2019, their car propelled Chris Ingram and Ross Whittock to the European Rally Championship driver and co-driver titles. The team finished just 3 points behind champions Saintéloc Junior Team.

2020
Toksport WRT joined the World Rally Championship-2 full-time in 2020, fielding two Škoda Fabia R5 Evo's throughout the season. Pontus Tidemand and Patrik Barth drove for the team starting from Rally Sweden. The pair finished on the podium in each of the six events they took part in, achieving three victories. They finished the season second in the standings with 108 points. Eyvind Brynildsen, co-driven by Ilka Minor, joined the team in Estonia, finishing on the podium twice in three rounds. Jan Kopecký and Jan Hloušek replaced Brynildsen for the final rally of the season, Rally Monza, in which they came third. The team finished the season in first place and won the Teams' Championship, beating PH Sport by 35 points.

In the European Rally Championship Toksport scaled back its involvement. The team did not enter in the main category, and instead fielded two Renault Clio RSR Rally5's in ERC-3 in the last two rallies of the season. Ola Nore Jr. and Rachele Somaschini competed in the Rally Hungary, while 2019 ERC Champion Chris Ingram returned to the series in the Rally Islas Canarias, driving alongside Nore.

Results

WRC-2 results

* Season still in progress.

ERC results

* Season still in progress.

References

External links
 

2002 establishments in Germany
German auto racing teams
European Rally Championship teams
World Rally Championship teams
ADAC GT Masters teams
Deutsche Tourenwagen Masters teams
Mercedes-Benz in motorsport
Porsche in motorsport
Auto racing teams established in 2002